Charles III Le Moyne (Longueuil, (18 October 1687 – 17 January 1755) was the second baron de Longueuil. He succeeded his father Charles le Moyne de Longueuil, Baron de Longueuil in 1729. He became Governor of Montreal, and administrator by interim of New France.

Biography 
Charles III Le Moyne was the son of Charles le Moyne de Longueuil, Baron de Longueuil, who was General Administrator for New France by interim. He named his son Commandant of Fort Niagara on April 28, 1726. In June 1733, Charles III was named Major of the military troops of the Government of Montreal; then in 1739, the Governor-General of New France, Marquis de Beauharnois, sent him to Louisiana, in order to help the Governor of Louisiana Jean-Baptiste Le Moyne de Bienville against the native Chicachas. He went back to Montreal in 1740; and a few years later, on May 23, 1749, Louis XV named him Governor of Montreal. After the death of the  Governor of New France Marquis de la Jonquière, the Intendant of New France François Bigot gave him the position of Administrator of New France; but he did not get permission from the King to keep his position, because he had named the successor of Marquis de la Jonquière before his death  marquis de Menneville. In August 1752, he became once more Governor of Montreal.

During his life he owned 7 slaves.

See also 

 Baron de Longueuil

Sources

Notes and references

External links 
 

1687 births
1755 deaths
Barons of Longueuil
People of New France
Governors of Montreal
Le Moyne family
18th-century Canadian politicians
French slave owners